Academy of Management Learning and Education is an academic journal sponsored by the Academy of Management. It covers management-related teaching, learning, and the management of business education.  According to the Journal Citation Reports, the journal had a 2020 impact factor of 4.373.

Editors 
The founding editor-in-chief was Roy Lewicki (Ohio State University). The following editor was James R. Bailey (George Washington University). J. Ben Arbaugh (University of Wisconsin Oshkosh) was the third editor. Kenneth G. Brown (University of Iowa, Tippie College of Business) finished his term in December 2014. The fifth editor was Christine Quinn Trank (Vanderbilt University). She finished her term in December 2017. The current editor is William M. Foster (University of Alberta). Current editor-in-chief is Paul Hibbert (University of St Andrews).

Controversy 
The journal generated a great deal of controversy by publishing several articles by scholars like Jeffery Pfeffer, Henry Mintzberg, and Sumantra Ghoshal, that were critical of the efficacy of MBA education. Other controversial publications include a critique of journal rankings and a critique of self-assessments as an assessment for learning.

References

External links 
 

Business and management journals
Education journals
Publications established in 2002
English-language journals
Quarterly journals
2002 establishments in the United States